The 2011–12 Spanish football season was Real Valladolid's second season in the second level in Spanish football after being defeated 3–2 on aggregate against Elche in La Liga promotion play-off in June 2011. This season will be the 31st of Real Valladolid in the second level in Spanish football. The general coordinator during last season, Chuti Molina, left his work on 14 June, becoming Real Murcia general director. On 17 June, Real Valladolid made official Abel Resino's detachment as he did not renew his contract as team manager. On 4 July, Carlos Suárez announced he had bought 59% of the club shareholding, becoming shareholder of Real Valladolid, and therefore the owner of the entity. At the same time he confirmed that he will not step down as chairman and, from the next day, news about the sporting aspect will be known. Earlier on 6 July, the club became official the incorporation of the Serbian manager Miroslav Đukić for the next 3 seasons. During that day, it also was confirmed that José Antonio García Calvo, general director, left his work.Real Valladolid qualified in 3rd position in Segunda División, behind both Deportivo and Celta de Vigo, with 82 points. It was the first time in the history that any team with 80+ points wasn't directly promoted to La Liga. Deportivo de La Coruña beat Real Valladolid's points record, getting 91 points in the whole season. The record was established by José Luis Mendilibar's team in 2007 when Real Valladolid scored 88 points and were champions.The team had to play the Promotion play-off again, and got the promotion to 2012–13 La Liga by winning 3–0 on aggregate to Córdoba in the Semifinal and by 2–1 to AD Alcorcón in the Final.

Trophies balance

Competitive balance

Summer transfers

In

Out

Loan out

Loan return

Loan end

Testing players

Winter transfers

Loan out

Personnel

Current technical staff

Current squad

Squad

Youth system

Called up by their national football team

Match stats

Match results

Pre-season and friendly tournaments

1st Villa del Tratado Trophy

14th Ramón Losada Trophy

Copa Castilla y León 2011

38th Ciudad de Valladolid Trophy

Liga Adelante

 Win   Draw   Lost

 Liga Adelante Winners (also promoted)
 Direct promotion to Liga BBVA (Liga Adelante Runners-up)
 Liga BBVA promotion play-offs
 Relegation to Segunda División B

Promotion play-off 
Final winners will be promoted to Liga BBVA. AD Alcorcón and Hércules will play the other Semifinal.

Semifinal 

Real Valladolid won 3–0 on aggregate and qualified for the Promotion play-off Final.

Final 

Real Valladolid won 2–1 on aggregate and got promoted to La Liga 2 years later.

Copa del Rey

Second qualifying round

Third qualifying round

Others
 Ismail Abdul Razak, with no minutes played with Real Valladolid since he arrived to the club from NSÍ Runavík, represented Balthazar in Valladolid 2012 Biblical Magi Parade.
 Manucho Contreiras did not come back to Valladolid after Christmas holiday so as to prepare the 2012 African Cup of Nations with Angola. He did not communicate to the club, and he was penalized.
 After some controversial statements about his performance, conditioned on the debts and his non-payment condition, Saná Camará was removed from the squad considering his inappropriate behavior. Miroslav Đukić even said at a press conference that "the team will remove Saná". He denounced the club to FIFA and lived the last months of the season retired in Porto (Portugal).

Notes

Spanish football clubs 2011–12 season
2011-12 Real Valladolid season